Fifth Gospel can refer to:
one of several real Christian gospels, see List of Gospels
 The Fifth Gospel, a 1003 German book by Philipp Vandenberg
 fifth gospel (genre), a literary genre